Douglass Township may refer to:

Douglass Township, Berks County, Pennsylvania
Douglass Township, Montgomery County, Pennsylvania

See also 
Douglassville, Pennsylvania, a census-designated place in Berks County
Douglass Township (disambiguation)
Douglas Township (disambiguation)

Pennsylvania township disambiguation pages